A list of films produced in Russia in 2007.

2007

See also
 2007 in Russia

External links
 Russian films of 2007 at the Internet Movie Database

2007
Films
Russia